This is a list of museums in the Aosta Valley, Italy.

References 

Aosta Valley
Museums in Aosta Valley